Sameer Dattani, also known as Dhyan (in the Kannada film industry), is an Indian actor who appears in Hindi, Kannada and Tamil films.

Career
Born into a Gujarati family in Bombay, Dattani has worked in predominately Hindi and Kannada films. He is fluent in several languages.

Dattani started his Hindi film career with Rajshri Productions. His first Hindi film Uuf Kya Jaadoo Mohabbat Hai was followed by roles in Madhur Bhandarkar's Corporate and Vikram Bhatt's Life Mein Kabhie Kabhie as well as films such as Pyar Mein Twist. In the Hindi film Mukhbir, directed by Mani Shankar, Dattani played the lead role of an undercover police informer.

Dattani appeared in the Kannada-language film Nanna Preethiya Hudugi which earned him the best debutant award in the South. Besides Monalisa, other Kannada film appearances include Amrithadhare.

Dattani's first Tamil film, produced by Gemini Films, was Kutty with Dhanush and Shriya Saran.

Shyam Benegal cast him in Well Done Abba (2010), alongside Boman Irani and Minissha Lamba. After premiering at international film festivals in Montreal, Dubai and London, it had its commercial release 26 March 2010.

In 2010, Dattani appeared in Dharma Productions', 
I Hate Luv Storys.

Filmography

References

External links

Living people
Male actors in Kannada cinema
Indian male film actors
1982 births
Male actors in Hindi cinema
Male actors from Mumbai
21st-century Indian male actors
Gujarati people